Two arrows. Stone Age Detective is a 1989 Soviet tragicomic crime film directed by Alla Surikova.

Plot
The film is set in the Stone Age period. A crime is committed within a tribe: "Gaunt", an intellectual who was to speak at the tribal council, is killed. All suspicions fall on "Eared", a peaceful young man, a dreamy painter. A trial begins during which all witnesses give evidence against Eared. It would seem that everything is clear, Eared is guilty and death awaits him. However, when the accused himself takes the case, acting as a lawyer of himself, the situation dramatically changes.

It turns out that all the "witnesses" are lying. Moreover, it was they themselves who have committed this crime, for they were consumed by envy and anger towards Gaunt. "Ladies' man" was vying for Gaunt's wife, "Eloquent" envied the orator's glory of the deceased. But the main instigator of Gaunt's destruction was the right-hand man of the tribe's chief - the "Fighting man". This warrior does not need democracy nor justice; he craves absolute power and is ready to do anything to achieve his goal.

As Eared proves his innocence before the tribal council, he himself is fatally shot in the back by the unseen archers. At that, the chief declares that the tribe is doomed because of the infighting, abdicates and walks away. Fighting man becomes the new chief. "Long-nosed", a friend of Eared, raises his voice against the murderers, but is promptly killed as well in the same manner. Just as all dissent seems suppressed, an arrow is shot at Fighting man from behind. He manages to dodge the arrow, but is visibly shaken. Everyone realizes that the days of peace are gone.

Cast
 Alexander Kuznetsov – "Eared", painter
 Olga Kabo – "Turtle", Eared's girlfriend
 Armen Dzhigarkhanyan – Head of the tribe
 Nikolai Karachentsov – "Fighting man"
 Leonid Yarmolnik – "Long-nosed"
 Sergey Shakurov – "Ladies' man"
 Stanislav Sadalsky – "Eloquent"
 Alexander Ivanov – "Gaunt"
 Natalya Gundareva – Gaunt's wife
 Maria Vinogradova – "Elderly" 
 Nina Maslova – mistress of Ladies' man
 Viktor Ilichyov – "Hurried"
 Vladimir Nosik – "Long-haired"
 Oleg Anofriyev – "Drummer"

References

External links

1989 films
1980s crime comedy-drama films
Films scored by Gennady Gladkov
Russian crime comedy-drama films
1980s Russian-language films
Mosfilm films
Soviet crime drama films